George Traynor (7 November 1905 – 1980) was a British athlete. He was the long jump Middlesex Champion in 1936 and 1937, the British AAA Champion in 1936 and competed in the men's long jump at the 1936 Summer Olympics.

References

1905 births
1980 deaths
Athletes (track and field) at the 1936 Summer Olympics
British male long jumpers
Olympic athletes of Great Britain
Athletes from London
Members of Thames Valley Harriers